Hein van Aken, also called Hendrik van Aken or van Haken, was the parish priest in Korbeek-Lo, between Leuven and Brussels. He was born in Brussels, probably in the thirteenth century. He translated the Roman de la Rose by Guillaume de Lorris and Jean de Meun to Dutch, with the title Het Bouc van der Rosen,. Hein's translation, also commonly called Die Rose, was widespread. This is notable due to the many manuscripts and excerpts that are still preserved, for example in the University Library of Ghent. He is probably also the poet of a Dutch reworking of the French Ordene de chevalerie. With less reason, some also attribute the Natuurkunde van het Geheel-al to him, but a poem by him must be kept in the Comburger manuscript.

In the Leeckenspeigel, some work by him has been intertwined, amongst others. His rhymed essay Over de Dichtkunst (On Poetry), which has been called remarkable by skilled reviewers because of the common sense that prevails in it.

References

Sources

13th-century births
14th-century deaths
Middle Dutch writers
Flemish poets
Flemish writers (before 1830)
13th-century poets
Flemish priests
People from Bierbeek
Clergy from Brussels
People from the Duchy of Brabant